Ramón Villa Zevallos Martínez (born October 6, 1970) is a Mexican football manager and former player.

References

External links

1970 births
Living people
Mexican footballers
Association football forwards
Club Universidad Nacional footballers
C.F. Monterrey players
Atlante F.C. footballers
Liga MX players
Mexican football managers
Liga MX Femenil managers
Footballers from Mexico City